Anu Elisa Koivisto (born 9 May 1980) is a 2-time Olympic swimmer from Finland. She swam for Finland at the 1996 and 2000 Olympics. During her swimming career, she swam to multiple Finnish championships and national records.

At the 1996 Olympics she was part of Finland's women's 4×100 Medley Relay, alongside Mia Hagman, Minna Salmela, and Marja Pärssinen.

Koivisto lives in Oslo, Norway with the retired Norwegian swimmer Børge Mørk. She has a dietitian's license and works for Norway's Olympiatoppen. The couple has two children, Kia and Alexis, and has caused controversy for being an anti-vaccinationist and not allowing her children to be vaccinated.

Medals 
 European Short Course Swimming Championships 2001: silver (50m backstroke) and bronze (200m backstroke)

Finnish records 
At one time Koivisto held the following Finnish Records:
Long Course (50m)
 200 Backstroke 2.14,92 (February 1, 1998, Greve)
 4×50 Freestyle Relay national team 1.47,68 (January 29, 1999, Greve)
 4×50 Medley Relay national team 1.59,93 (January 31, 1999, Greve)
 4×100 Medley Relay national team 4.14,14 (July 24, 1996 Atlanta)

Short Course (25m)
 50 Backstroke 27,75 (December 15, 2001, Antwerp)
 200 Backstroke 2.07,10 (December 16, 2001, Antwerp)

References

1980 births
Living people
Finnish female backstroke swimmers
Swimmers at the 1996 Summer Olympics
Swimmers at the 2000 Summer Olympics
Olympic swimmers of Finland
Swimmers from Helsinki
Finnish expatriates in Norway